Taluqdar is a historic occupational title in South Asia (predominantly Bengal) which is now used as a surname. Notable people with the surname include:

Talukdar
 Abdul Hady Talukdar (1905-1985), Bangladeshi academic administrator
 Abdul Jabbar Talukdar, politician from Barisal
 Abdul Majid Talukdar, former MP of Bogra-3
 Abdul Momin Talukdar (1929-1995), lawyer and former Deputy Minister of Local Government, Rural Development and Co-operatives
 Amartya Talukdar, men's rights activist
 Amjad Hossain Talukdar, former MP of Kurigram-3
 Anwar Jung Talukdar (died 1986), former MP of Dhaka-18
 Anwarul Kabir Talukdar (1944-2020), former Bangladeshi Minister of Power
 Bhomita Talukdar, Assamese terrorist
 Dipankar Talukdar (born 1952), former Minister of Chittagong Hill Tracts Affairs
 Fazlul Haque Talukdar, politician from Barisal
 Hatem Ali Talukdar, former MP of Tangail-2
 Jahangir Alam Talukdar (born 1968), Bangladeshi cricketer
 Jayanta Talukdar (born 1986), archer from Assam
 Jony Talukdar (born 1993), Bangladeshi cricketer
 Keramat Ali Talukdar, politician from Mymensingh
 Mahbub Talukdar (born 1942), Bangladeshi poet and civil servant 
 Manoranjan Talukdar, Marxist from Assam
 Motahar Hossain Talukdar (1922-2001), activist for the Bengali language movement
 Motiur Rahman Talukdar, politician from Barguna
 Mrigen Talukdar, cricketer from Assam
 Nurul Amin Talukdar, Sector No. 11 commander for Bangladesh
 Phanidhar Talukdar, former MLA of Bhabanipur, Assam
 Pranita Talukdar (1935-2019), former MLA of Sorbhog, Assam
 Rony Talukdar (born 1990), Bangladeshi first-class cricketer
 Ruhul Quddus Talukdar (born 1962), Bangladeshi lawyer
 Shashwati Talukdar, Indian academic-filmmaker based in New York
 Talukdar Towhid Jung Murad (born 1971), former MP of Dhaka-19
 Zinnatunnessa Talukdar, former Minister of Primary and Mass Education

Talukder
 Abdul Hamid Talukder, former MP of Sirajganj-4
 Abdul Mannan Talukder, former MP of Sirajganj-3
 Abdul Momen Talukder, former MP of Bogra-3
 Abdur Rouf Talukder (born 1964), senior secretary at the Bangladeshi Ministry of Finance
 Abdus Salam Talukder (1936–1999), former secretary-general of Bangladesh Nationalist Party
 Atowar Rahman Talukder, former MP of Rajshahi-6
 Hasan Ali Talukder, former MP of Bogra-3
 Helaluzzaman Talukder, former MP of Bogra-7
 Iftiquar Uddin Talukder Pintu, former MP of Netrokona-3
 Ishaque Hossain Talukder (died 2014), former MP of Sirajganj-3
 Ismail Hossain Talukder, former MP of Mymensingh-2
 Jahurul Islam Talukdar, former MP of Pabna-1
 Jalal Uddin Talukder (died 2012), politician from Netrokona
 Joly Talukder, general secretary of the Bangladesh Garment Workers Trade Union Centre
 Karimuzzaman Talukder, former MP of Jamalpur-3
 Kosiruddin Talukder (1899–1971), doctor murdered in the Bangladesh Liberation War
 Mofiz Uddin Talukder, former MP of Sirajganj-5
 Mujibur Rahman Talukder (died 2001), freedom fighter
 Nazir Ahmad Talukder, politician from Faridpur
 Nazrul Islam Talukder (born 1964), Judge of the High Court Division of Bangladesh Supreme Court
 Nurul Islam Talukder, MP of Bogra-3
 Nurul Islam Talukder, former MP of Sirajganj-6
 Parvin Talukder Maya, politician
 Rashid Talukder (1939–2011), photojournalist
 Ratan Talukder (born 1957), martial artist and actor
 Setara Talukdar, Jatiya Party politician
 Shahidul Alam Talukder, former MP of Patuakhali-2
 Talukder Abdul Khaleque (born 1952), two-time Mayor of Khulna
 Talukder Md.Yunus (born 1952), MP of Barisal-2
 Talukder Moniruzzaman (1938–2019), political scientist and National Professor
 Shahjahan Ali Talukder (1955-2020), former MP of Bogra-5
 Shamsul Haque Talukder, former MP of Tangail-2
 Sirajul Huq Talukder, former MP of Bogra-5
 Ushatan Talukder (born 1950), general secretary of the Parbatya Chattagram Jana Samhati Samiti

Taluqdar
Haji Shariatullah Taluqdar (1781–1840), religious leader and founder of the Faraizi movement
Iqbal Hasan Mahmud Taluqdar, former Minister of Power
Muhsinuddin Ahmad Taluqdar (1819–1862), second leader of the Faraizi movement
Taluqdar Abdullah al Mahmood (1900-1975), former Minister of Industries and Production

See also
Colvin Taluqdars' College, Lucknow, India
Government Abdur Rashid Talukdar Degree College, Barisal, Bangladesh